Taungoo Township  or Toungoo Township is a township in Taungoo District in the Bago Region of Burma. The principal town is Taungoo.

References

Townships of the Bago Region
Taungoo District